Kan Pesum Vaarthaigal is a 2013 Tamil-language drama film directed by R. Balaji. Produced and written by R. Saravanakumar, the film stars Mirchi Senthil and Iniya, while Livingston, Aadukalam Murugadoss, Jangiri Madhumitha, and Rajendran play supporting roles. The music was composed by Shamanth. The film was released on 22 March 2013 and centers upon a young man who rethinks his life after his father attempts suicide. The film was filmed in Chennai and Singapore, with most of the filming taking place in Singapore.

Plot
Mahesh (Mirchi Senthil) is an unemployed man living in Thiruvarur who enjoys hanging out with his friends. His father (Livingston) is unhappy with his son's irresponsible lifestyle and attempts suicide. Mahesh then begins to search for a job, and with the help of his friend Appukutty (Aadukalam Murugadoss), finds a job in Singapore. He meets Janani (Iniya), who is a Singapore citizen, and attempts to marry her in order to obtain citizenship. However, the truth is that Janani is not a Singapore citizen.

Cast
 Mirchi Senthil as Mahesh
 Iniya as Janani
 Livingston as Mahesh's father
 Aadukalam Murugadoss as Appukutty
 Jangiri Madhumitha as Nimmi
 Rajendran

Reception
IBN Live wrote that the film was "a good attempt, but following just four characters is a bit tiring at times." The Hindu issued feedback on how the subject is perfect from the talent adoption history of Singapore from R. Saravana Kumar, who reacted to the review of Udhav Naig from The Hindu said that it was a "classic example of how easily things can go wrong in a film, when two producers, who have largely ignored the need to research their subject matter, come together. The review came within hours of the movie was released. However there is no proof for Udhav Naig's irresponsible statement that the writer has largely ignored the research . In fact, the Singapore talent adoption history (favouring the writer)  shows that they are continuously on the lookout for talent from overseas. Thus the review conflicts from the fact." Malini Mannath from The New Indian Express said "The film has a lyrical title and some appealing visuals of Singapore. But not sufficient to make the celluloid trip worthwhile!".

References

External links
 

2013 films
2010s Tamil-language films